Abel Ehrlich  (Hebrew: אבל ארליך; September 3, 1915 – October 30, 2003) was an Israeli composer. In 1997, Ehrlich won the Israel Prize for Music.

Biography 
Erlich was born in 1915 in Cranz, East Prussia. In 1934 he and his family fled from Nazi Germany to Yugoslavia and pursued music studies in Zagreb. He left Yugoslavia in 1939 and, after a short stay in Albania, immigrated to Mandatory Palestine.

In Israel he continued his studies at the Eretz-Israel Conservatory in Jerusalem.

He taught at various institutes such as the Israel Conservatory, the Rubin Academy of Music, Jerusalem; the Rubin Academy of Music, Tel Aviv; Bar-Ilan University and Oranim Academic College. 

He died on October 30, 2003, in Tel Aviv, Israel.

Awards 
 In 1972, was awarded a prize of the Alte Kirche Foundation, Boswil, Switzerland, for his work ARPMUSIC.
 In 1997, he was awarded the Israel Prize, for music.
 He was awarded the ACUM Prize (8 times), the Liberson Prize (3 times) and the Prime Minister's Prize for Israeli Composers.

See also
List of Israel Prize recipients

References

1915 births
2003 deaths
People from Zelenogradsk
People from East Prussia
German emigrants to Mandatory Palestine
Israeli composers
Israel Prize in music recipients
Academic staff of Bar-Ilan University
Academic staff of Oranim Academic College